"Natteravn" is a pop song recorded by Danish singer Rasmus Seebach taken from his debut album by the same name. It was released as the album's fourth single in Denmark. The song was a huge success in Sweden in June 2010, peaking high on the Swedish Spotify Chart and peaking at #4 at Sverigetopplistan, the official chart.

Charts and Sales

Weekly charts

Year-end charts

Certifications

"Calling (Nighthawk)"

"Calling (Nighthawk)", the English language version of "Natteravn" was released elsewhere and became a minor hit for Seebach in Germany reaching #90 in the German Singles Chart.

References

2010 singles
Rasmus Seebach songs
2009 songs
Songs written by Rasmus Seebach
Universal Music Group singles
Songs written by Ankerstjerne